The Manchester North West by-election was a Parliamentary by-election held on 24 April 1908. The constituency returned one Member of Parliament (MP) to the House of Commons of the United Kingdom, elected by the first past the post voting system.

Vacancy
Winston Churchill had been Liberal MP for the seat of Manchester North West since the 1906 general election when he gained it from the Conservatives.  He was obliged to submit to re-election in after his appointment as President of the Board of Trade, as the Ministers of the Crown Act required newly appointed Cabinet ministers to re-contest their seats.

Electoral history
Before Churchill had gained the seat it had been Conservative since it was created in 1885.  So it was a tough assignment to retain the seat given the result was in 1906;

Candidates
The local Liberal Association re-selected 34-year-old Winston Churchill to defend his seat. His political career to date was Member of Parliament for Oldham from 1900–1906, Member of Parliament for Manchester North West since 1906, Under-Secretary of State for the Colonies from 1905–1908, and newly appointed President of the Board of Trade.
The Conservatives retained 43-year-old William Joynson-Hicks as their candidate.  This was his third election to parliament, having contested neighbouring Manchester North in 1900, losing by 26 votes.  He was a London solicitor.
Although there was no Labour Party candidate, the rival Social Democratic Federation parachuted in a 54-year-old Branch Secretary, Dan Irving to contest the seat.  Burnley was one of the SDF's strongest branches due to the activities of their leader Henry Hyndman.  In 1902, Irving had won election to Burnley Town Council.  At the 1906 general election, Irving had contested Accrington finishing a poor third.

Campaign
Polling Day was fixed for the 24 April 1908.

Manchester had been a key battleground at the 1906 general election.  It was known to favour Free trade and oppose the protectionist policies of Joseph Chamberlain.  Conservatives defeats in Manchester in 1906 were blamed on Tariff reform policies. Many Manchester Conservatives opposed Tariff reform, including Joynson-Hicks.  His position helped to neutralise the issue in the by-election and promote local Conservative unity.  However, Churchill still received endorsement from the Free Trade League.

Suffragettes harassed Churchill, over his refusal to support legislation that would give women the vote. This opposition was led by the Women's Social and Political Union and suffragettes Constance Markievicz, Eva Gore-Booth, and Esther Roper.

There was Jewish hostility to Joynson-Hicks over his support for the controversial Aliens Act.
A number of Roman Catholic priests urged their congregation to vote Conservative after Joynson-Hicks attacked Liberal education policy for undermining the autonomy of Roman Catholic Schools.

Result
The Conservatives regained the seat.

The following day, the Daily Telegraph ran a front page headline "Winston Churchill is OUT! OUT! OUT!"
The Lancashire and Cheshire Women's Suffrage Society, who had supported Churchill during the by-election, were angered by the actions of the WSPU, stating that they were "actively assisting to return men to the House of Commons who are the sworn enemies of the people." and saying that the WSPU members were "Tories of the most pronounced type".

Aftermath
Although Churchill lost his seat he was soon back, on 9 May 1908, after winning the 1908 Dundee by-election.
Joynson-Hicks gained personal notoriety in the immediate aftermath of this election for an address to his Jewish hosts at a dinner given by the Maccabean Society, during which he said "he had beaten them all thoroughly and soundly and was no longer their servant." This act may have contributed to him losing his seat back to the Liberals at the next election.

At the January 1910 general election, Irving stood for the SDF at Rochdale, coming third.

References

Manchester North West by-election
Manchester North West by-election
North West
Ministerial by-elections to the Parliament of the United Kingdom
1900s in Manchester
Manchester North West by-election
Manc